Waterford railway station (Plunkett Station) serves the city of Waterford in County Waterford, Ireland. The station is located across Rice Bridge on the north side of the city.

There are two bays at the west end of the station. These are platform 5 and 6 respectively. The main platform is quite long and due to a crossover it can be operated as two platforms if necessary. The eastern end is platform 3, the western end being platform 4. A large signal cabin is situated across the running lines. The station area is still currently controlled by semaphore signals.

Services

The station is a significant interchange. It is the terminus for InterCity services from Dublin Heuston and InterCity services  from Limerick Junction. Travel to Limerick Junction provides onward connections to Cork, Killarney, Tralee, Limerick, Ennis, Athenry and Galway.

There are seven daily trains in each direction between Waterford - Dublin Mondays to Saturdays inclusive. One extra Dublin to Waterford train runs Friday only and one extra Waterford to Dublin train runs Friday and Saturday only.
On Sundays there are four trains each way.
The fastest of these trains being the 07.10 Waterford - Dublin which completes the journey in exactly 1 hour and 48 minutes.

There are two trains each way between Waterford - Limerick Junction Mondays to Saturdays inclusive. There is no Sunday service on this line. Until 19 January 2013 (inclusive) there were three trains each way. However, the late-morning Waterford to Limerick Junction and early-afternoon Limerick Junction to Waterford trains are now discontinued.

Rail replacement bus to Rosslare Europort
Until 18 September 2010 (inclusive), there was one daily return train between Waterford and Rosslare, after which time passenger trains on the line were suspended. The rail service was replaced by a revised Bus Éireann Route 370 service from Monday 20 September 2010. However, the replacement bus service does not serve the railway station, the nearest stop being the bus station a walk of several minutes.
In 2021, the transport minister Eamon Ryan said the government were reviewing the line with a possibility of re-opening it.

Facilities
The station has a booking office, ticket vending machines, shop, waiting areas, toilets and a car park.

Freight
The station is directly rail connected to Waterford Port (Belview). A freight yard is located at the Dublin/Limerick end of the station, served by freight traffics such as cement and timber which travel to and from Dublin Port and Ballina.

History
The station opened on 26 August 1864 as Waterford North. It was renamed Plunkett on 10 April 1966 in commemoration of Joseph Plunkett, one of the executed leaders of the Easter Rising of 1916.

Future Development
As part of the Waterford North Quay SDZ Scheme the present station will be closed and a new station opened on the North Quays. The new station will be part of a "Transport Hub" with bus station and other transport infrastructure. A new sustainable transport bridge (bus, cycle and pedestrian bridge) will link the transport hub to the other side of river/Waterford city centre.

Statistics

Gallery

See also
 List of railway stations in Ireland

References

External links
Irish Rail Waterford Station Website
South Tipperary Rail & Bus Website

Iarnród Éireann stations in County Waterford
Railway stations opened in 1864